Love and Other Disasters is the third album by Swedish heavy metal band Sonic Syndicate. It was released on 19 September 2008 and on 14 October in North America. A digipack version of the album was made available featuring two bonus tracks and a DVD. In the United States, the album sold around 800 copies in its first week; landing it on the Billboard Heatseekers chart at 85. Love and Other Disasters is the last album by the band to feature former singer Roland Johansson, and the last to be produced by Jonas Kjellgren. It is also the only album by the band to feature the same line-up as the preceding one.

On 27 June the lead single of the album called "Jack of Diamonds" was released to radio, the same day it was performed live for the first time on the Metaltown Festival in 2008. Three other singles were also released: "My Escape", "Power Shift", and "Contradiction". A 14th track entitled "Freeman" was also made but didn't make it to the album.

Track listing

Bonus tracks

Bonus DVD
 "Studio Report" (Making of "Love and Other Disasters")
 "Jack of Diamonds" (Official video)
 "My Escape" (Official video)
 "Denied" (Official video)
 "Enclave" (Official video)
 "Psychic Suicide" (live in Cologne)
 "Blue Eyed Fiend" (live in Cologne)
 Shopping in Paris

The Rebellion Pack
The special edition of the album was reissued on November 6, 2009 together with the band's 2009 Rebellion EP, featuring two brand-new songs as well as the debut record with their new singer Nathan Biggs, replacing Roland Johansson.

Demo titles
 "Bullet My Asshole" (pre-"Encaged")
 "Finnish" (pre-"Jack of Diamonds")
 "Kjellgren" ("Stewart" in English, pre-"Power Shift")
 "Breaking Benjamin's Leg" (pre-"Contradiction")
 "Export" (pre-"Damage Control")
 "Blame Canada" (pre-"Affliction")
 "Bandit" (pre-"Mission: Undertaker")
 "Panic" (pre-"Freeman")

Chart positions

Personnel
Sonic Syndicate
 Roland Johansson – vocals, additional guitars & solo on "Red Eyed Friend"  
 Richard Sjunnesson – harsh vocals
 Roger Sjunnesson – guitars, keyboards
 Robin Sjunnesson – guitars
 Karin Axelsson – bass guitars
 John Bengtsson – drums, percussion
 Nathan James Biggs - vocals ("Burn This City" & "Rebellion in Nightmareland")

Additional musicians
 Nick Red – keyboards on "My Escape," "Fallout" & "Contradiction"

Production
 Jonas Kjellgren – producer/engineer
 Roberto Laghi – mixer
 Achim Köhler – masterer
 Torsten Bürgin – artwork
 Sabine Hauptmann – artwork
 Micke Johansson – photography
 Patric Ullaeus – director ("Jack of Diamonds" & "My Escape")
 Marius Böttcher – director ("Power Shift" & "Contradiction")

References

2008 albums
Sonic Syndicate albums
Nuclear Blast albums